The Toyota N platform is a car platform for executive cars (E-class models) from Toyota, introduced in 2003. It is often called "Mark X platform" and "Crown platform", after its core uses, and, less frequently, "Lexus GS platform".  It is used on a variety of sizes of rear- and all-wheel drive automobiles, ranging from compact to full-sized executive.

In 2018, the N platform was replaced by the Toyota New Global Architecture TNGA-L platform.

Features 
 The body is monocoque;
 It is a rear-wheel drive platform, with optional four-wheel drive;
 4WD variants use Toyota's FOUR system, which is full-time with 3 differentials (center, rear and front);
 Engines are mounted longitudinally;
 Front suspension is double wishbone, while rear is multi-link;
 Disc brakes are used at all four corners.

N

Applications 

 Lexus LF-X concept (2003)
 Toyota Crown/Crown Majesta — S180 (2003–2008), S200 (2008–2012), S210 (2012–2020)
 Toyota Mark X sedan — X120 (2004–2009), X130 (2009–2019)
 Toyota Century — G60 (2018–present)
 Lexus IS — XE20 (2005–2014)
 Lexus GS — S190 (2005–2012)
 Lexus LS — XF40 (2006–2017)

New N

Applications 
 Lexus GS — L10 (2012–2020)
 Lexus IS — XE30 (2013–present)
 Lexus RC — XC10 (2014–present)

References 

N